Olczyk is a Polish surname. Notable people with the surname include:

 Eddie Olczyk (born 1966), American ice hockey player and coach and broadcaster, brother of Rick
 Rick Olczyk (born 1970), American ice hockey executive, brother of Eddie
 Stanisław Olczyk (1935–1991), Polish ice hockey player

See also
 

Polish-language surnames